The Pakistan Fencing Federation is the governing body of fencing in Pakistan.The Federation was formed in 1999 with its headquarters in Lahore.

Affiliations 
The federation is affiliated with:
 International Fencing Federation (FIE)
 Fencing Confederation of Asia
 Pakistan Olympic Association

Affiliated bodies
The following sports bodies affiliated with the federation:

Provincial 
 Punjab Fencing Association
 Sindh Fencing Association
 Khyber Fencing Swimming Association
 Balochistan Fencing Association
 Islamabad Fencing Association
 Gilgit Baltistan Fencing Association

Departmental 
 Pakistan Army
 Pakistan Navy
 Pakistan Air Force 
 WAPDA Sports Boards
 Higher Education Commission
 Pakistan Railway

Other 
 Pakistan Women Fencing Association

References

External links
 Official Website

National members of the Asian Fencing Confederation
Sports governing bodies in Pakistan
1999 establishments in Pakistan
Sports organizations established in 1999